KKLH (104.7 FM) is a radio station broadcasting a classic rock format. Licensed to Marshfield, Missouri, United States, it serves the Springfield, Missouri area.  The station is currently owned by Mid-West Family Broadcasting.

104.7 The Cave is the home for the Kansas City Chiefs football games and programming for the Springfield market.

References

External links

KLH
Classic rock radio stations in the United States
Radio stations established in 1992